Bombe (Geʽez: ቦምቤ) is a town in Wolayita Zone of the Southern Nations, Nationalities, and Peoples' Region, Ethiopia. Bombe town is located 325 km and 55 km away from Addis Ababa and Wolaita Sodo town through Hossana exit, respectively. Bombe town is used as an administrative capital of Boloso Bombe woreda of Wolaita Zone. It is located at an elevation of 1,531 meters above sea level. The amenities in the town are 24 hours electric light, pure water service, kindergarten, primary and high schools, health center, everyday public market and others. Bombe lies between about 7°08'04"North 37°34'54"East

Demographics
Bombe is a populated place in Southern Nations Nationalities and Peoples regional state. It is a town with more than 11,000 people. As per population projection conducted by Central Statistical Agency of Ethiopia in 2019, the town Bombe has a total population of 11,969. And among this figure Males count 6,045 and Females count 5,924.

References

Wolayita
Populated places in the Southern Nations, Nationalities, and Peoples' Region
Cities and towns in Wolayita Zone